The St. Paul Saints were a 20th-century Minor League Baseball team that played in the American Association from 1901 to 1960 in the city of St. Paul, Minnesota. The 1920, 1922, and 1923 Saints are recognized as being among the 100 greatest minor league teams of all time.

History

After decades of independence, the Saints became a farm club affiliate of the Chicago White Sox (1936–1942), the Brooklyn Dodgers (1944–1957), and the Los Angeles Dodgers (1958–1960). Their Minnesota rivals, the Minneapolis Millers, were during different periods the top minor league affiliate of the New York Giants and the Boston Red Sox.

The Saints played the first two years at the Dale and Aurora Grounds in St. Paul. The Saints also played from 1903 to 1909 at a downtown ballpark located on Robert Street between 12th and 13th Streets, and at the  original Lexington Park at Lexington and University Avenue until 1913 when a fire damaged the structure. A new ballpark with a seating capacity of 10,000 was constructed in 1914 at University and Dunlap, which served as the home of the Saints through 1956. The Saints played their final four seasons at Midway Stadium, a modern ballpark located at 1000 North Snelling Avenue with a seating capacity of more than 13,000. 

The two rival Twin Cities ball clubs played heated "streetcar double-headers" on holidays, playing one game in each city.  Over the years 1902–1960, the Saints compiled a 4719–4435 record, second only in winning percentage to the Millers' .524.  The Saints won nine league pennants, and won the Little World Series championship in 1924, topping the Baltimore Orioles in ten games.

When the Minnesota Twins came to the Twin Cities in 1961, the Saints became the Omaha Dodgers.

A newer version of the team began play in 1993 and is currently the AAA affiliate of the Minnesota Twins.

Notable players

Sandy Amoros (1951)
Ginger Beaumont (1911)
Joe Black (1951)
Ralph Branca (1945–1946)
Ben Chapman (1929)
Pat Collins (1925)
Chuck Dressen (1921–1924)
Leo Durocher (1927)
Bubbles Hargrave (1918–1920, 1929)
Miller Huggins (1901–1903)
Mark Koenig (1921–1922, 1924–1925)
Clem Labine (1949–1952)
Gene Mauch (1946)
Chief Meyers (1908)
Cy Morgan (1906)
Johnny Murphy (1930–1931)
Dick Williams (1954)
Don Zimmer (1953)

Baseball Hall of Famers

References
Baseball Reference
Johnson, Lloyd, and Wolff, Miles, ed., The Encyclopedia of Minor League Baseball, 1997 edition. Durham, N.C.: Baseball America.
"The St. Paul Saints: Baseball in the Capital City", Minnesota Historical Society Press, 2015, by Stew Thornley 

Professional baseball teams in Minnesota
Sports in Saint Paul, Minnesota
Defunct American Association (1902–1997) teams
Brooklyn Dodgers minor league affiliates
Chicago White Sox minor league affiliates
Los Angeles Dodgers minor league affiliates
1901 establishments in Minnesota
1960 disestablishments in Minnesota
Defunct baseball teams in Minnesota
Defunct Western League teams